"Dark Shanghai" is a Sailor Steve Costigan short story by Robert E. Howard.  It was originally published in the January 1932 issue of Action Stories. Howard earned $75 for the sale of this story.

The story is now in the public domain.

References

External links

 List of stories and publication details at Howard Works

Short stories by Robert E. Howard
Pulp stories
1932 short stories
Short stories about boxing
Works originally published in Action Stories
Short stories set in Shanghai